Nuthankal mandal is one of the 23 mandals in Suryapet district of the Indian state of Telangana. It is under the administration of Suryapet revenue division with its headquarters at Nuthankal.  It is bounded by Thungathurthy mandal towards its west, Athmakur (S) mandal towards its south, Maddirala mandal towards its north, and Mahabubabad district towards its east.

Geography
It is in the 212 m elevation (altitude).

Demographics
Nuthanakal mandal is having population of 33,305. Talla Singaram is the largest village and Gundla Singaram is the smallest village in the mandal.

Villages
 census of India, the mandal has 14 settlements. 
The settlements in the mandal are listed below:

Notes
(†) Mandal headquarter

References

Mandals in Suryapet district